Minnelli on Minnelli: Live at the Palace was a concert presented by Liza Minnelli at the Palace Theatre on Broadway from December 8, 1999 through January 2, 2000. The show consisted of songs featured in films directed by her father, Vincente Minnelli (1903-1986).

Production
A national tour of 17 cities was planned for the Spring of 2000, but it was cancelled after Minnelli developed hip problems and contracted pneumonia.

Recorded over two nights at the Palace Theatre on Broadway, this was Minnelli's first New York show since her 1992 show from Radio City Music Hall. The show was written and directed by Fred Ebb. Ebb had previously written Liza Minnelli's first club act in 1965, and her 1992 Radio City music Hall show. Minnelli was accompanied onstage by six male dancers.

"The Trolley Song" was performed as an electronic duet with her late mother, Judy Garland, who had introduced the song in the 1944 film Meet Me In St. Louis. The Palace Theatre had been the site for Garland's "comebacks" in 1951 and 1967.

William Ruhlmann at Allmusic.com framed the show in light of Minnelli's recent health and substance-abuse problems, commenting that she had "aged audibly: her voice is weaker, she struggles for breath, and her vibrato is wobbly...If Minnelli informed her work with age and experience, she might develop an interesting autumnal phase". Of her duet with Judy Garland on "The Trolley Song", Ruhlmann wrote that "she passes from self-parody to a kind of pathetic competition she previously avoided. It may be that Liza Minnelli doesn't know how to age as a performer."

Track listing 
 Overture - (Marvin Hamlisch) - 0:45
 "If I Had You" (Irving King, Ted Shapiro) - 3:14
 "Taking a Chance on Love" (Vernon Duke, Ted Fetter, John La Touche) - 2:43
 "Love" (Ralph Blane, Hugh Martin) - 3:18
 "Limehouse Blues" (Philip Braham, Douglas Furber) - 5:27
 "Meet Me in St. Louis, Louis" (Kerry Mills, Andrew B. Sterling) - 0:42
 "Under the Bamboo Tree" (Bob Cole, Dink Johnson) - 1:47
 "The Boy Next Door" (Blane, Martin) - 1:23
 "Skip to My Lou" (Traditional) - 1:13
 "Have Yourself a Merry Little Christmas" (Blane, Martin) - 1:40
 "That's Entertainment" (Howard Dietz, Arthur Schwartz) - 1:58
 "I Guess I'll Have to Change My Plan" (Dietz, Schwartz) - 2:08
 "Triplets" (Dietz, Schwartz) - 3:10
 "Dancing in the Dark" (Dietz, Schwartz) - 1:38
 "A Shine on Your Shoes" (Dietz, Schwartz) - 5:07
 "I Got Rhythm" (George Gershwin, Ira Gershwin) - 4:20
 "Baubles, Bangles, & Beads" (Alexander Borodin, Robert Wright, George Forrest) - 3:56
 "The Night They Invented Champagne" (Alan Jay Lerner, Frederick Loewe) - 2:13
 "I'm Glad I'm Not Young Anymore" (Lerner, Loewe) - 3:16
 "What Did I Have That I Don't Have?" (Burton Lane, Lerner) - 3:57
 "Thank Heaven for Little Girls" (Lerner, Loewe) - 1:48
 "The Trolley Song" (Blane, Martin) - 2:43
 "My Heart Belongs to Daddy" (Cole Porter) - 1:54
 "I Thank You" (Fred Ebb, John Kander) - 4:37

Personnel 
Liza Minnelli - vocals, liner notes
Jeffrey Broadhurst, Stephen Campanella, Billy Hartung, Sebastian LaCause, Jim Newman, Alec Timerman - dance, vocals
Musicians
Sean Smith - double bass
Ed Xiques - bass clarinet, alto flute, baritone saxophone
Frank Perowsky - clarinet, flute, piccolo, soprano saxophone, tenor saxophone
Mark Vinci - clarinet, flute, piccolo, alto saxophone, soprano saxophone
Mike Migliore - clarinet, flute, piccolo, alto saxophone
Bill LaVorgna - conductor, director, snare drum
Russ Kassoff - conductor, contractor, keyboards, piano
Kaitilin Mahony - French horn
Bill Washer - guitar
Bill Hayes - percussion
George Flynn - bass trombone
Dale Kirkland, Clinton Sharman - trombone
Danny Cahn, Ross Konikoff, Dave Stahl - trumpet
John Dexter - viola
Ethel Abelson - violin
Production
Marvin Hamlisch - arranger, conductor
Billy Stritch - arranger, producer, vocal arrangement
Rex Reed - liner notes
Jessica Novod - art direction, design
Joe Bates, John Harrell - assistant engineer
Richard Avedon, Joan Marcus - photography
Phil Ramone - producer
Ted Jensen - mastering
Andrew Felluss - mixing assistant
Fred Ebb - director
Lisa Brooke - concert master
Gordon H. Jee - director
Ken Freeman - editing
Frank Filipetti - engineer

References

2000 live albums
Tribute albums
Liza Minnelli live albums
Albums produced by Phil Ramone
Angel Records live albums
1999 concert residencies
2000 concert residencies
Liza Minnelli concert residencies
Concert residencies on Broadway